Ferdinand Wittig (October 20, 1851 – April 17, 1909) was an American merchant, farmer, and politician.

Born in Holby, Sjotland, Denmark, Wittig emigrated to the United States, in 1872, and settled in New Denmark, Brown County, Wisconsin. For a time he worked in the woods in northern Wisconsin and owned a farm in New Denmark. He was also in the general mercantile business and also owned a cheese factory. Wittig served as county treasurer for Brown County in 1907 and was a Republican. In 1909, Wittig served in the Wisconsin State Assembly until he died while still in office. Wittig died at his home in New Denmark, Wisconsin, as a result of a stroke he had suffered.

Notes

1851 births
1909 deaths
Danish emigrants to the United States
People from New Denmark, Wisconsin
Businesspeople from Wisconsin
Farmers from Wisconsin
Republican Party members of the Wisconsin State Assembly
19th-century American politicians